Julio Peralta and Horacio Zeballos were the defending champions but chose not to defend their title.

Ariel Behar and Fabiano de Paula won the title after defeating Máximo González and Fabrício Neis 7–6(7–3), 5–7, [10–8] in the final.

Seeds

Draw

References
 Main Draw

Copa Fila - Doubles
2017 Doubles